Senegal competed at the 1984 Summer Olympics in Los Angeles, United States. Out of 24 contestants, no medals were won by Senegal on this occasion.

Results by event

Athletics
Men's 100 metres 
Charles-Louis Seck

Men's 400 metres 
Boubacar Diallo
 Heat — 46.73 (→ did not advance)

Men's 800 metres 
Moussa Fall
Babacar Niang

Men's 400m Hurdles 
Amadou Dia Bâ

Men's 4 × 100 m Relay 
Mamadou Sène
Hamidou Diawara
Ibrahima Fall
Charles-Louis Seck
Saliou Seck

Men's 4 × 400 m Relay 
Boubacar Diallo
Babacar Niang
Moussa Fall
Amadou Dia Bâ

Men's 3,000 Metres Steeplechase
Mamadou Boye

Men's Triple Jump 
Mamadou Diallo

Women's High Jump 
Constance Senghor
 Qualification — 1.70m (→ did not advance, 27th place)

Judo
Men's Extra-Lightweight
Djibril Sall

Men's Lightweight
Ibrahima Diallo

Men's Half-Middleweight
Ousseynou Guèye

Men's Half-Heavyweight
Abdul Daffé

Men's Heavyweight
Khalif Diouf

Men's Open Class
Lansana Coly

Sailing
Mixed's Windsurfer
Babacar Wade

Shooting
Men's Rapid-Fire Pistol (25 metres)
Mamadou Sow

Men's Free Pistol (50 metres)
Amadou Ciré Baal

Wrestling
Men's Freestyle Flyweight 
Talla Diaw

Men's Freestyle Light-Heavyweight 
Amadou Katy Diop

Men's Freestyle Heavyweight 
Ambroise Sarr

Men's Freestyle Super-Heavyweight
Mamadou Sakho

References
Official Olympic Reports
Senegalese Olympic Committee

Nations at the 1984 Summer Olympics
1984
Oly